It Attracted Three Fellows (German: Es zogen drei Burschen) is a 1928 German silent comedy film directed by Carl Wilhelm and starring Hans Albers, Hans Junkermann and Eugen Burg. Its title is a shortened version of the name of a popular song Es zogen drei Burschen wohl über den Rhein.

The film's sets were designed by the art director Kurt Richter

Cast
 Hans Albers as Strafversetzter Oberleutnant 
 Hans Junkermann as General 
 Eugen Burg as Spiessbürgerin 
 Hertha von Walther as Tänzerin 
 Julia Serda as Spiessbürgerin 
 Karl Harbacher as Soldat 
 Fritz Kampers as Soldat 
 Ida Wüst as Spiessbürgerin 
 Olga Engl
 Ossi Oswalda
 Hans Brausewetter
 Teddy Bill
 Harry Lamberts-Paulsen
 Emmy Wyda

References

Bibliography
 Alfred Krautz. International directory of cinematographers, set- and costume designers in film, Volume 4. Saur, 1984.

External links

1928 films
Films of the Weimar Republic
German silent feature films
Films directed by Carl Wilhelm
1928 comedy films
German comedy films
German black-and-white films
Silent comedy films
1920s German films